Mikhail Youzhny won the title, beating Benjamin Becker 7–5, 6–3

Seeds

Draw

Finals

Top half

Bottom half

References
 Main Draw
 Qualifying Draw

2015 ATP Challenger Tour
2015 Singles